The 1969 Caribe Hilton Championships was a combined men's and women's tennis tournament played on hard courts at the Caribe Hilton Hotel in San Juan, Puerto Rico. It was the fourteenth edition of the tournament and was held from on March 31 through April 6, 1969. American Arthur Ashe and Australian Margaret Court won the singles titles.

Finals

Men's singles

 Arthur Ashe defeated  Charlie Pasarell 5–7, 5–7, 6–0, 6–4, 6–3

Women's singles

 Margaret Court defeated  Julie Heldman 6–4, 7–5

Men's doubles

 Phil Dent /  John Alexander defeated  Mark Cox /  Peter Curtis 6–3, 6–3

Women's doubles

 Karen Krantzcke /  Kerry Melville defeated  Mary-Ann Eisel /  Valerie Ziegenfuss 6–4, 7–5

References

Caribe Hilton Championships
Caribe Hilton Championships
Caribe Hilton Championships